Peter James Donnelly (born 11 May 1965) is an English footballer, who played as a midfielder in the Football League for Chester City.

References

1965 births
Living people
Association football midfielders
Chester City F.C. players
Oswestry Town F.C. players
English Football League players
People from Chester
English footballers